Kirza is a type of artificial leather based on the multi-layer textile fabric, modified by membrane-like substances, produced mainly in the Soviet Union. The surface of kirza imitates pig leather.

The material is mainly used in production of military boots, where it is a cheap and effective replacement for natural leather. It is also used in production of the belts for machinery and automobiles.

While some English dictionaries translate кирза as kersey, this is incorrect, as kersey is a material of natural origin known since the Middle Ages. However, kersey was used in the production of the first kirza. According to a popular legend, the name kirza is an acronym for Kirovskiy zavod (Kirov factory), a factory producing artificial leather located near Kirov. However, the actual name of the factory was Iskozh (an acronym for "iskusstvennaya kozha" - artificial leather), and the legend is simply an example of folk etymology.

The original leather substitute was invented in 1904 by Mikhail Pomortsev, who used a mixture of egg yolk, rosin and paraffin wax to impregnate kersey. The new material received several awards in Russia and abroad, but was not used due to lobbying by leather boot manufacturers. Despite being much-needed in the Red army following the Russian revolution, it remained expensive for the Soviet Union until the invention of synthetic latex in the early 1930s replaced the initial impregnating mixture used. Aleksandr Khomutov, chief engineer of Kozhimit synthetic leather factory in Moscow, and his fellow engineer Ivan Plotnikov developed a new material in 1939 named Kirza SK. Mass production of this new material began during the Winter War between the Soviet Union and Finland. The material initially proved unfit for winter conditions, and production was halted. However, the technology was quickly improved and mass production resumed in the autumn and winter of 1941 to meet demand for army boots during the German invasion of Soviet Union.

Aleksandr Khomutov, Ivan Plotnikov and seven other specialists were awarded the 2nd Degree Stalin Prize on 10 April 1942 for their invention of the new kirza production technology.

The basic technology used to produce kirza has not seen any major change since 1941. However, kirza has remained in production in the Soviet Union, modern Russia, and in several other countries.  About 85% of the kirza produced in Russia is used in military boots (including modern combat boots). Most modern kirza boots are produced from a combination of 85% kirza and 15% of specially prepared natural leather (the so-called yuft or Russia leather). About 150 million pairs of kirza footwear have been produced up to the present day.

See also
Jackboot
Footwraps
Puttee

References 

Footwear
Technical fabrics
Artificial leather
Soviet Army
Soviet inventions